Byron Wien (born 1933) is an American investor and vice chairman of Blackstone Advisory Partners, a subsidiary of The Blackstone Group.

In 2001, he retired after 21 years as Chief (later Senior) U.S. Investment Strategist at Morgan Stanley, but retained an advisory position with the company as senior investment strategist.

In 1995, Wien co-authored a book with George Soros on the legendary investor’s life and philosophy, Soros on Soros – Staying Ahead of the Curve. In 1998 he was named by First Call the most widely read analyst on Wall Street and in 2000 was ranked the No. 1 strategist by SmartMoney.com based on his market calls during that year. Wien was named to the 2004 SmartMoney Power 30 list of Wall Street’s most influential investors, thinkers, enforcers, policy makers, players and market movers. He appeared in the “Thinker” category.

In 2006, Wien was named by New York Magazine as one of the sixteen most influential people in Wall Street. The New York Society of Security Analysts (NYSSA) presented Wien with a lifetime achievement award in 2008.

Wien was a 1950 graduate of Nicholas Senn High School in the Edgewater neighborhood on the North Side of Chicago.  He received an AB with honors from Harvard College, where he was on the staff of The Harvard Crimson. He later graduated with an MBA from Harvard Business School. He is on the Investment Advisory Committee of The Open Society Foundation, and a member of the Investment Committees of Lincoln Center and The Pritzker Foundation. He is a trustee of the New York Historical Society and Chairman of the Investment Committee of the JPB Foundation.

References 

American business executives
Harvard Business School alumni
Harvard College alumni
1933 births
Living people
The Harvard Crimson people

Blackstone bio